The Masam Project is a humanitarian landmine clearance project in Yemen, was launched by the Kingdom of Saudi Arabia in June 2018. It works in coordination and partnership with Yemen Executive Mine Action Center (YEMAC) to clear Yemeni territory of indiscriminate Anti-tank (AT) and Anti-personnel mines (AP) along with improvised explosive devices (IED) and unexploded ordnance (UXO) with the aim of controlling the humanitarian catastrophe caused by mines in Yemen.

Project goals 

The project goals are to design the operational approach and reconnaissance, prepare plans to clear the interiors of Yemen of mines and UXO together with training and equipping the Yemeni local teams to swiftly respond to emergency situations, and sending these teams in different areas for carrying out demining operations. The goals also include guidance, ongoing operational support and comprehensive clearance operations in line with the international demining standards.

Project Phases 

 Locating landmines in liberated areas
 Rapid response to emergency situations and clearing the area of landmines and UXO
 Training and equipping local teams along with providing them with the technical and logistical support for dealing with mines
 Carrying out comprehensive clearance operations of mines in line with the international demining standards.

Masam Experts 
The team has a group of senior demining experts that have knowledge on camouflaged mines in Yemen.

Demining operations have caused the death of 30 Masam personnel, including five foreign experts and 52 others have been injured while carrying out their demining operations since 2018.

Project work areas 

The number of mines, indiscriminately planted in Yemeni territory, has reached hundreds of thousands. Masam has worked since the launch of the project in eleven areas:

 Sana'a
 Hodeidah
 Aden
 Al-Bayda
 Al Jawf
 Lahej
 Marib
 Shabwa
 Taiz
 Al Dhale'
 Saada

Statistics and results 
Since launching the project at the end of June 2018 until December 2022:

 Masam has cleared 379,605 mines, UXO and IED
 The total cleared area (M2) 42,644,021
 Total AP mines: 5,979
 Total AT mines 135,525
 Total UXO 230,431
 Total IED: 7,670

Project annual reports

2018 

 Total cleared area (M2): 1,332,830
 Total AP mines: 707
 Total AT mines: 19,242
 Total UXO: 11,345
 Total IED: 914

2019 

 Total cleared area (M2): 5,505,327
 Total AP mines: 1,013
 Total AT mines: 26,432
 Total UXO: 57,301
 Total IED: 3,191

2020 

 Total cleared area (M2): 11,279,363
 Total AP mines: 858
 Total AT mines: 14,735
 Total UXO: 71,066
 Total IED: 1,710

2021 

 Total cleared area (M2): 10,814,936
 Total AP mines: 1,704
 Total AT mines: 42077
 Total UXO: 48,143
 Total IED: 423.

2022 

 Total cleared area (M2): 137,111,65
 Total AP mines: 1,697
 Total AT mines: 33,048
 Total UXO: 42,576
 Total IED: 1,432

Mine victims in Yemen 
Masam has significantly contributed to reducing the number of mine victims in Yemen over a period of five years. The American Center for Justice (an unofficial organization) launched its report entitled "Mines: The Blind Killer", which monitors and documents cases of killing, injury and destruction of property, as a result of the mines. The report indicated that from June 2014 to February 2022, about 2,526 civilians, including 429 children and 217 women, were killed, and 3,286 others were injured, including 723 children and 220 women, in seventeen Yemeni governorates. About 75% of those have been permanently maimed or disfigured. The report documents the destruction of about 425 different private means of transportation completely and 163 partially due to landmines.

The difference between removing military mines and humanitarian mines 
In areas of armed conflict, mines are cleared by a military method, and this is of paramount importance to swiftly open a safe path through which soldiers and military units can pass without danger and this is carried out for tactical reasons. This includes working in minefields under all- weather conditions, to carry out a mine clearance operation, taking great care not to cause casualties.

The sphere of work of Masam is the removal of humanitarian mines, which are operations that begin following the driving out the armed militias from the occupied area. These operations aim mainly to survey and secure these areas completely so as not to cause disasters among the local residents. This phase requires a great deal of time and effort, as it aims to get rid of all the planted mines, because after the end of the conflict in the area, civilians will return to their normal lives. So it is necessary to secure them from explosive remnants of war (ERW), such as UXO and landmines.

Ottawa Convention 1997 
Signed in Norway on 18 September 1997, the Convention on the Prohibition of the Use, Stockpiling, Production and Transfer of Anti-Personnel Mines and on their Destruction of 1997, known informally as the Ottawa Treaty, the Anti-Personnel Mine Ban Convention, or often simply the Mine Ban Treaty, aims at eliminating anti-personnel landmines (AP-mines) around the world. It was launched to end the suffering and casualties caused by AP mines that kill or maim, every week, hundreds of people, most of them are innocent and unarmed civilians, especially children, and impede economic development and reconstruction, prevent refugees and internally displaced persons from returning to their homeland along with causing other extremely grave consequences after years of planting them.

Project management 
Since its establishment, Masam has been managed by Saudi expert Osama bin Yousef Al-Gosaibi.

References 

Arms control treaties
Projects in Asia
Mine action
Mine warfare and mine clearance organizations
Organizations established in 2018